The Tonga (also called Batonga,  Lake Shore Tonga or Nyasa Tonga) are an  ethnic group living in northern Malawi on the shores of Lake Malawi in Nkhata Bay and northern part of Nkhotakota. Their language and Tonga people of Zambia and Zimbabwe belong to different branches of the Bantu family.

History
Tradition says the Tonga came from the north, perhaps from the Maravi people or the Tumbuka. Until the coming of the Ngoni in 1855, they had been a matrilineal people and possessed a decentralized government.

The Tonga were constantly raided by the Ngoni, mostly for food, women and young men. The young were incorporated into the Ngoni fighting regiments. The population of high ranking Atonga warriors among the Angoni impis grew and this terrified the Angoni who saw this as a threat. A plot was hatched to exterminate the Atonga older folk. The Atonga,led by Chinyentha, had uncovered the plot and revolted, before the operation was executed. The Angoni sent impis to pursue the fleeing parties but the impis were crushed by Mankhambira at Chintheche. This was some time in 1875. 

As of 1993, about a quarter of a million people were Tongas.

Lifestyle

The Tonga were primarily a fishing people with cassava as their staple food. Through mission education, they were able to earn higher wages during colonial times and worked primarily as porters, skilled or semi-skilled workers, and armed auxiliaries.

The Tonga people pay lobola (bride price) in the form of money, with kin liable for further payments if a child or wife falls ill. Males could not divorce their wives without a hearing of public repudiation, while she and her family could dismiss him without formality, unless he had a wealthy or otherwise powerful family. The kin of a woman dying away from home could also demand burial permission and heavy payment from the husband.

The Tonga in Chintheche are known by the surname Chirwa; some other names in Tonga are Kaunda, Ngema, Longwe, Ng'oma, Manda,  and Mhone.

Religion

The Tonga believed in a supreme God who remained vague and almost forgotten, for the Bantu had primarily a religion of the dead. They worshipped ancestral spirits, believed in consulting diviners, spirit-possession, and sought out those who predicted the future and were supposed to receive messages from ancestors. Spirits of the dead were recognized, honored, and propitiated. The Batonga of Lake Nyasa say certain medicines can help a person ensure his or her changing after death into any chosen animal.

Language 
There are more than 170,000 speakers of the Malawi Tonga language.

(Note that the Tonga language in Zambia is also classified as of the Bantu language family, but belongs to a completely different type.)

The language is called chiTonga. The 'chi' means 'the language of the', like 'ki' in kiSwahili or 'se' in seTswana.

References
Bauer, Andreus. "Raising the Flag of War".
Davidson, Basil. "African Kingdoms".
Tew, Mary. "People of the Lake Nyasa Region".

Ethnic groups in Malawi